Sir Harry Mason Garner  (3 November 1891 – 7 August 1977) was a British aerodynamicist who was also notable as an expert on, and collector of, oriental ceramics.

Biography
Garner was one of three boys and a daughter. His eldest brother, William Edward (1889–1960) was born in Hugglescote in Leicestershire and became an expert in explosives. His other brother Frederic Horace (1893–1964) became a chemistry professor. Harry was educated at Market Bosworth Grammar School and St John's College, Cambridge. He worked for the British government on aerodynamics leading a group at Felixstowe on marine aviation before becoming chief scientist at the Ministry of Supply.

Meanwhile, he became a noted expert and collector of oriental art. He started by collecting Chinese blue and white porcelain, and also wrote on Chinese lacquerware, especially carved lacquer, and published on these and other subjects.  In 1954 he recognised the two vases now known as the David Vases as the only fourteenth century blue and white porcelain then known. Garner and his wife made donations of furniture. He was a friend of Sir Percival David. Both of these made substantial donations to the British Museum. Amongst Garner's collection were the Kakiemon elephants.

Honours
Harry Garner was appointed CB in the King's Birthday Honours of 1948 and was knighted KBE in the New Year Honours of 1951. Sir Harry Garner was the last person knighted by King George VI. He was a Fellow of the Royal Aeronautical Society.

References
GARNER, Sir Harry Mason, Who Was Who, A & C Black, 1920–2015; online edn, Oxford University Press, 2014
Sir Harry Harner (obituary), The Times, London, 10 August 1977, page 16

1891 births
1977 deaths
Alumni of St John's College, Cambridge
Aerodynamicists
People associated with the British Museum
British orientalists
British ceramicists
Knights Commander of the Order of the British Empire
Companions of the Order of the Bath
Fellows of the Royal Aeronautical Society
Historians of East Asian art
People from Hugglescote
20th-century ceramists